Sam Winans is an American film and television composer. He studied music theory in college and privately with Merv Kennedy, a jazz musician, and then studied orchestration with Spud Murphy, creator of the Equal Interval System (EIS). His music has appeared on TV shows such as Lizzie McGuire, Harts of the West, Flight 29 Down, Happily Ever After: Fairy Tales for Every Child, and Kids Incorporated, and the 1988 animated feature Pound Puppies and the Legend of Big Paw.

External links
Official site

American film score composers
American male film score composers
Living people
Place of birth missing (living people)
Year of birth missing (living people)